A Few Days Later (Chand Rooz Ba'd) is a 2006 Iranian motion picture by Niki Karimi.

The script for the movie won the Hubert Bals Fund of the Rotterdam Film Festival.

See also
Cinema of Iran

References

External links

Hubert Bals Fund: realizing dreams
Niki Karimi's official website

2006 films
2006 drama films
Iranian drama films
2000s Persian-language films
Films directed by Niki Karimi